Bulbophyllum percorniculatum is a species of orchid. It is endemic to southeastern Madagascar.

References

The Bulbophyllum-Checklist
The Internet Orchid Species Photo Encyclopedia

percorniculatum
Orchids of Madagascar
Endemic flora of Madagascar
Plants described in 1951
Taxa named by Joseph Marie Henry Alfred Perrier de la Bâthie